Sai Tun Aung (born 13 October 1963) is a Burmese politician who currently serves as a House of Nationalities member of parliament for Shan State No. 2 constituency. He is a member of Shan Nationalities League for Democracy.

Early life and education
He was born on 13 October 1963 in Shan State, Burma (Myanmar). He graduated with B.A (L.L.B) from Yangon University.

Political career
He is a member of the Shan Nationalities League for Democracy. In the 2015 Myanmar general election, he was elected to the House of Nationalities, winning a majority of the 79,134 votes cast by the Shan State No. 2 parliamentary constituency.

References

National League for Democracy politicians
1963 births
Living people
People from Shan State
University of Yangon alumni